Zschaitz-Ottewig is a former municipality in the district of Mittelsachsen, in Saxony, Germany. On 1 January 2023, it was merged with Ostrau to form the new municipality of Jahnatal.

Historical population (since 1990) 

Recorded on 31 December unless otherwise noted:

* 3 October

References

Mittelsachsen
Former municipalities in Saxony